Mesaceratherium is an extinct genus of rhinoceros.

References

Miocene rhinoceroses
Miocene mammals of Asia
Fossil taxa described in 1969